The men's vault was a gymnastics event contested as part of the Gymnastics at the 1964 Summer Olympics programme at the Tokyo Metropolitan Gymnasium. The event was held on 18, 20, and 23 October. There were 130 competitors from 30 nations, with nations in the team competition having up to 6 gymnasts and other nations entering up to 3 gymnasts. For the first time in three Games, there was a clear winner with no tie. Haruhiro Yamashita took the gold medal, the second consecutive gold for Japan. Victor Lisitsky finished second, taking silver but breaking the Soviet Union's three-Games gold medal streak. Hannu Rantakari's bronze was Finland's first medal in the event since 1948.

Background

This was the 11th appearance of the event, which is one of the five apparatus events held every time there were apparatus events at the Summer Olympics (no apparatus events were held in 1900, 1908, 1912, or 1920). Seven of the top 11 (including three-way tie for 9th) gymnasts from 1960 returned: joint gold medalists Takashi Ono of Japan and Boris Shakhlin of the Soviet Union, fourth-place finisher Yury Titov of the Soviet Union, fifth-place finisher Yukio Endo, sixth-place finisher Shuji Tsurumi, and eighth-place finisher Takashi Mitsukuri of Japan, and ninth-place finishers Franco Menichelli and Giovanni Carminucci of Italy. Ono had also taken bronze in 1952, Titov had taken bronze in 1956, and Shakhlin had finished fourth in 1956. The reigning (1962) world champion was Přemysl Krbec of Czechoslovakia, with Haruhiro Yamashita of Japan second and Endo and Shakhlin tied for third.

Algeria, the Republic of China, Iran, Mongolia, and the Philippines each made their debut in the men's vault. The United States made its 10th appearance, most of any nation, having missed only the inaugural 1896 Games.

Competition format

The gymnastics all-around events continued to use the aggregation format. Each nation entered a team of six gymnasts or up to two individual gymnasts. All entrants in the gymnastics competitions performed both a compulsory exercise and a voluntary exercise for each apparatus. The scores for all 12 exercises were summed to give an individual all-around score. The event used a "vaulting horse" aligned parallel to the gymnast's run (rather than the modern "vaulting table" in use since 2004).

These exercise scores were also used for qualification for the apparatus finals. The two exercises (compulsory and voluntary) for each apparatus were summed to give an apparatus score; the top 6 in each apparatus participated in the finals; others were ranked 7th through 130th. For the apparatus finals, the all-around score for that apparatus was multiplied by one-half then added to the final round exercise score to give a final total.

Exercise scores ranged from 0 to 10, with the final total apparatus score from 0 to 20.

Schedule

All times are Japan Standard Time (UTC+9)

Results

Each gymnast competed in both compulsory and optional exercises, with the median scores from the four judges for the two sets of exercises were summed. This score was also used in calculating both individual all-around and team scores.

The top 6 advanced to the final for the apparatus, keeping half of their preliminary score to be added to their final score.

References

Sources
 

Gymnastics at the 1964 Summer Olympics
Men's 1964
Men's events at the 1964 Summer Olympics